The Amla–Betul Passenger is a passenger train belonging to Central Railway zone that runs between  and . It is currently being operated with 51239/51240 train numbers on a daily basis.

Average speed and frequency 
The 51239/Amla–Betul Passenger runs with an average speed of 40 km/h and completes 23 km in 35m.
The 51240/Betul–Amla Passenger runs with an average speed of 35 km/h and completes 23 km in 40m.

Route and halts 
The important halts of the train are:

Coach composite 
The train has standard ICF rakes with max speed of 110 kmph. The train consists of 9 coaches:

 7 General Unreserved
 2 Seating cum Luggage Rake

Traction
Both trains are hauled by an Itarsi Loco Shed-based WDM-3A or WDP-4 diesel locomotive from Amla to Betul and vice versa.

Rake sharing
The train shares its rake with 51253/51254 Amla–Chhindwara Passenger and 51293/51294 Nagpur–Amla Passenger.

See also 
 Amla Junction railway station
 Chhindwara Junction railway station
 Amla–Chhindwara Passenger
 Nagpur–Amla Passenger

Notes

References

External links 
 51239/Amla–Betul Passenger India Rail Info
 51240/Betul–Amla Passenger India Rail Info

Rail transport in Madhya Pradesh
Slow and fast passenger trains in India